There are to streams in Zala County, Hungary under this name. These are:

 Lower Válicka 
 Upper Válicka